The sixth edition of the South American Championship was scheduled to be held in Chile, but Brazil asked to host it as part of its 100th anniversary independence celebrations. Thus it was held in Rio de Janeiro between 17 September and 22 October 1922.

Overview

All CONMEBOL members (as of 1922) attended: Argentina, Brazil, Chile, Paraguay and Uruguay.

Squads
For a complete list of participants squads see: 1922 South American Championship squads

Venues

Final round
Each team played one match against each of the other teams. Two points were awarded for a win, one point for a draw and zero points for a defeat.

The match was abandoned after Paraguay walked off to protest the penalty kick awarded by the referee.

Play-off

As Brazil, Paraguay and Uruguay finished tied on points, a playoff series was planned for the three teams; however, Uruguay withdrew from the competition to protest the performance of Brazilian referee Pedro Santos in their match against Paraguay.

Therefore, a playoff match was played between Brazil and Paraguay to determine the champion.

Result

Goal scorers

4 goals
  Juan Francia

2 goals

  Amilcar
  Formiga
  Neco
  Gerardo Rivas

1 goal

  Ángel Chiessa
  José Gaslini
  Tatú
  Manuel Bravo
  Carlos Elizeche
  Luis Fretes
  Ildefonso López
  Julio Ramírez
  Felipe Buffoni
  Juan C. Heguy
  Antonio Urdinarán

References

External links
 South American Championship 1922 at RSSSF

 
1922
1922
1922 in South American football
1922 in Brazilian football
1922 in Argentine football
1922 in Uruguayan football
1922 in Paraguayan football
1922 in Chile
September 1922 sports events
October 1922 sports events
20th century in Rio de Janeiro
International sports competitions in Rio de Janeiro (city)